The least soft-furred mouse or least praomys (Praomys minor) is a species of rodent in the family Muridae.
It is found only in Democratic Republic of the Congo.
Its natural habitat is subtropical or tropical moist lowland forest.

References

Praomys
Mammals described in 1934
Taxonomy articles created by Polbot
Southern Congolian forest–savanna mosaic